Ștefan Hrușcă (born 8 December 1957) is a Romanian-Canadian folk singer known for his Christmas carols. He was born in Ieud, Maramureș County.

References

External links 
 Homepage

1957 births
Living people
People from Maramureș County
Romanian folk singers
Romanian emigrants to Canada